SUMA Tower building is the highest building in Kumanovo, North Macedonia.

The building has 18 floors of residential space, plus 2 floors of commercial space where a modern shopping center is located alongside offices of engineering companies, organizations etc.

Buildings and structures in Kumanovo